Chase the Kangaroo is the fourth studio release, and third full-length studio album, from Christian alternative rock band the Choir, released in 1988. Considered by critics to be one of their finest albums, Chase the Kangaroo is listed at No. 50 in the book CCM Presents: The 100 Greatest Albums in Christian Music, published in 2002, and No. 4 on the list of the "Top 100 Christian Rock Albums of All Time" by HM Magazine in 2010.

Background
In the midst of supporting Daniel Amos on their Fearful Symmetry tour in late 1986, the Choir received some devastating news — drummer and lyricist Steve Hindalong's wife Nancy had suffered her second miscarriage. This experience drove Hindalong to write a poem for his wife entitled "A Sad Face," which was inspired by the Bible verse in Ecclesiastes 7:3 which said, "Sorrow is better than laughter, because a sad face is good for the heart." This verse would ultimately become the theme of the Choir's next album, and the poem's lyrics would be revised and adapted for the song, "Sad Face." Even though the Choir had achieved a heightened national profile during this time due to touring across the US with both Daniel Amos and Randy Stonehill, Hindalong was forced to make ends meet by working in construction, which included digging ditches. However, lead singer and guitarist Derri Daugherty was able to put aside enough money to create his own recording studio, dubbed "Neverland" as an homage to Peter Pan, located right next door to Pakaderm Studios in Los Alamitos, CA, where the band recorded their prior two studio releases.

Recording and production
 
The recording process for Chase the Kangaroo was long and difficult, and Daugherty and Hindalong felt the pressure of living up to the success of Diamonds and Rain as well as proving themselves as producers. "We really struggled to make this record," Hindalong said. "It took us 20 weeks, we had pretty much recorded it twice, and we never agreed about much during the process." When the Choir wasn't using the studio, Adam Again came in at night to record their sophomore album Ten Songs by Adam Again, and it wasn't unusual for the Choir to arrive at Neverland in the morning and see Adam Again frontman Gene Eugene still working away at the controls. Eugene would end up mixing the first two songs on Chase the Kangaroo, and he and Riki Michele would also contribute background vocals. Hindalong would return the favor by co-writing the first two tracks on Ten Songs.

Chase the Kangaroo benefited from other key contributors, primarily lead singer and bass guitarist Steve Griffith from Vector. According to Hindalong, Griffith was "a great engineer, who engineered the All Fall Down record for the 77’s up in Sacramento. We were such a fan of that album, for a period of a few weeks, we brought Steve down to work with us." Griffith would perform a variety of duties, including bass guitar, additional production and background vocals. Mark Heard, who had helped produce the re-recorded version of "A Million Years," also returned to assist with engineering, recording and background vocals.

One challenge during the recording process was capturing the work of saxophone and Lyricon player Dan Michaels, who — in contrast to his more animated stage presence — would tend to freeze up under studio pressure. As a result, Daugherty and Hindalong asked Michaels to "just play along with a track" as a "rehearsal," so they could secretly record his performance; most of Michaels' contributions on Chase the Kangaroo were captured this way.

Composition

Music
The Choir explored far more atmospheric and ambient textures on Chase the Kangaroo with "deep rhythms, layered guitars, [and] haunting vocals." Daugherty experimented extensively with multiple guitars and effects, and Hindalong implemented drum programming along with a variety of analog drum setups, all of which were present on the album’s thematic centerpiece, "Sad Face." To create that song, the band started jamming together, and then "the whole thing formed nearly in one sound check," according to bass guitarist Tim Chandler. Daugherty then used a Korg SDD 3000 Delay for its "weird, harmonic modulation feature," which Hindalong claimed was "one of my favorite guitar things Derri's ever done." Hindalong used an E-mu SP-12 for the drum programming, which included sampling his own kick and snare drum work, and it was Eugene who insisted the drum machine end the song with no musical accompaniment before transitioning into the ambient instrumental coda. Finally, Michaels used a Yamaha version of a Lyricon run through an Oberheim extension module for a more digital-sounding musical contribution.

In addition to "Sad Face," Daugherty said that "one of the [proudest] things of ours that I've ever done" is the instrumental break for "Clouds," which was created using an initial recording on magnetic tape, then flipped backwards to record additional instrumentation with the assistance of DAT technology. "[Back] then, it was not easy to do," Daugherty said. "There weren’t a lot of bands doing that kind of thing." Daugherty also experimented with a wah-wah pedal, which was used on both "Look Out (For Your Own)" and "Children of Time." Michaels' saxophone solo at the end of the latter song was another example of "sabotage recording," as he put it, in which he was captured on tape doing warmups. This exact solo would be re-used again in "I’m Sorry I Laughed" on 2010's Burning Like the Midnight Sun.

Hindalong also experimented with different percussion techniques. On "Look Out (For Your Own)," he used Blasticks (plastic-tipped drumsticks) on a custom drum setup inspired by Mick Fleetwood, using a floor tom and high hat on each side of the drum kit. Hindalong also took advantage of studio technology for the recording of "Cain," as he could not play the drums fast enough. Engineer Dave Hackbarth slowed the analog tape down so Hindalong could play along, which made the final performance sound much tighter at normal speed.

Lyrics
"Sad Face," with its transparent and vulnerable lyrics, proved to be the most impactful song on the album, as the band has received more mail about this song than anything else they have ever recorded, and it has become a live set list mainstay in the years since. Many of the other songs on the album also dealt with weighty topics, like mortality ("Children of Time"), the deadly power of words ("Cain"), the importance of caring for one’s eldest family members ("Look Out (For Your Own)") and disconnection from loved ones ("So Far Away").

"Clouds" was a key exception, with a strong worshipful mood. It was one of the last songs written for the album, and was inspired by a quote that Hindalong read in Oswald Chambers' devotional My Utmost for His Highest: "After the amazing delight and liberty of realizing what Jesus Christ does, comes the impenetrable darkness of realizing Who He is." Hindalong also drew upon imagery of clouds and thick darkness from Psalm 97:2. "The center of our music is the mystery of God, what we don't know, and accepting the fact that more and more will be revealed," he explained. The song then ends with a snippet of Daugherty's mother Louise singing a hymn at the church where his father served as pastor.

"The Rifleman" juxtaposed spoken verses by a number of individuals, primarily road manager Marc Sercomb, as well as background vocalist Sharon McCall, Hindalong and others, with Daugherty singing the chorus. The song then fades into a reprise of "Render Love" from Diamonds and Rain at the very end, as Hindalong wanted to explore the tension between what people say and what they do when it comes to violence. "I was really influenced by Bruce Cockburn and some of his real anti-war, pacifist type thinking," Hindalong said, "[and] we’d have these big political arguments all the time. I've always enjoyed violence and revenge as much as anybody else; growing up, The Rifleman was my favorite show. That’s why at the end I put 'Render Love' just to show that irony of […] I can argue about whatever I want to argue about, but it doesn't make me a pacifist in my heart. We're all conflicted."   

"Everybody in the Band" was thrown together quickly in the studio as a way to ensure a tenth song on the album, and to add a shot of levity. This was the first time Hindalong performed lead vocals on a Choir song, and his humorous lyrics honor Sercomb with the line, "He smokes a lot of Camels"; however, this was replaced by, "In tears for man's condition," as Myrrh would not allow the mention of smoking in the lyrics. This song and its lyrics would be reinterpreted by the band countless times in concert, particularly on the Choir's acoustic tour for de-plumed in 2010.

The title track "Chase the Kangaroo" was inspired by a Bugs Bunny cartoon that Hindalong watched during the time he was working construction, "mostly picking and shoveling, in the ditch for days." Although Bugs Bunny tunneled his way through to China, Hindalong looked at a globe and determined that if he continued digging through the earth, he'd actually end up in Australia. Hindalong called the title of the album, "the stupidest thing ever," and a result of "thinking too hard." Nevertheless, Hindalong hoped that the song's focus on perseverance would "[inspire] others to press on. Life is really challenging, and we've had plenty of troubles. We're growing, we're still evolving, we're still learning. We still have a lot of hope."

Artwork and packaging
Upon initial release, the album cover artwork for Chase the Kangaroo differed for each of the three primary audio formats at that time (vinyl, cassette and CD). In addition, the external printed song order was incorrect, with "Clouds" listed first, instead of "Consider." The liner notes were entirely hand-written by Hindalong, and included occasional song details as well as the original lyrics for "Everybody in the Band."

Release
Chase the Kangaroo was released in March of 1988. The Choir and friends celebrated with a big party at Neverland, and it was on that night that Robin Spurs was announced as the band’s new bassist. Originally with the popular L.A. cult band the Toasters, Spurs was introduced to the Choir by her then-boyfriend, writer Chris Willman, who would later go on to be a music critic and features editor for Entertainment Weekly and Variety, respectively. Spurs immediately joined the Choir on tour as they played a mixture of L.A. clubs (the Roxy and the Troubador), opening slots for the 77's, and their own shows across the US.

The tension and urgency to this new collection of songs, along with its overall sense of foreboding, made the band wonder if Myrrh would ever let them record another album. "What are they going to do with this?" Derri asked. Ironically, it was a significantly edited version of the expansive "Clouds" that was sent out to Christian radio as the album's first single, but it garnered very little airplay. Stations had issues with the lyric, "The blood is still as rich / That poor sinners drink like wine," claiming that reference to the Christian practice of Communion was "too Catholic for Christian radio." Myrrh quickly sent out "Consider" as the follow-up single, and it hit #1 on the Christian rock charts the week of July 4, 1988. Sales of Chase the Kangaroo eventually outpaced that of Diamonds and Rain.

The original CD release of Chase the Kangaroo included all five songs from Shades of Gray as bonus tracks.

In 2012, to celebrate the album's 25th anniversary, Chase the Kangaroo was reissued as a 2-CD set, with the second CD featuring audio commentary for each song on the album from Hindalong, Daugherty, Chandler and Michaels. The Choir followed this with a short tour, on which they played the entire album in its entirety, along with selected tracks from The Loudest Sound Ever Heard.

Critical response and legacy

Chase the Kangaroo is listed at No. 50 in the book CCM Presents: The 100 Greatest Albums in Christian Music. In that entry, writer Brian Quincy Newcomb stated that "it was the passion in the lyrics and Daugherty’s vocal delivery — together with the overall energy of the instrumental arrangements — that lifted this album above the norm." He praised the "keen philosophical insights […] that engaged the mind and trusted the listener to figure out what was what," and called the Choir "a Christian band that rocked with intensity," and "the real deal." 

At the time of release, Cornerstone Magazine expressed similar sentiments, and wrote that Chase the Kangaroo was "musically stunning and lyrically brilliant." The review praised Daugherty's lead guitar work as "favorably comparing to the Edge's," declaring that the album was "biting atmospheric rock of diamond quality." 

Retrospectively, Mark Allan Powell wrote in the Encyclopedia of Contemporary Christian Music that "the band achieves a more distinctive sound on Chase the Kangaroo," and regarded the "martial drumbeat" of "Clouds" as, "similar to that which undergirds Fleetwood Mac's Tusk." He also praised Hindalong's "poetic sensibilities [that] are atypical for an industry with a decided tendency toward predictable expressions and themes." HM Magazine ranked the album at No. 4 on the list of "Top 100 Christian Rock Albums of All Time," saying that "this band helped define how great 'alternative' Christian rock could be," and described the album as a "warm, yet melancholy journey." In his four-star review for all AllMusic, Mark Allender wrote that the strength of the album is in its musicianship: "Hindalong's drumming really comes to the forefront on this release – held silent for so long. And Daugherty's guitar commands the sound of the record through subtlety and restraint." He summed up Chase the Kangaroo as "a work of creativity and integrity."

Track listing
All lyrics by Steve Hindalong. All music by Hindalong, Derri Daugherty and Tim Chandler, except where noted.

Personnel
The Choir
 Derri Daugherty – lead vocals, guitars, keyboards
 Steve Hindalong – drums, percussion, vocals, lead vocals on "Everybody in the Band"
 Tim Chandler – bass guitar
 Dan Michaels – saxophone and Lyricon

Additional musicians
 Bill Batstone – keyboards ("Clouds"), background vocals ("Clouds", "Cain")
 Steve Griffith – bass guitar, background vocals ("Clouds")
 Nancy Hindalong – background vocals ("Sad Face")
 Mark Heard – background vocals (“Cain”)
 Gene Eugene – background vocals ("Look Out (For Your Own)")
 Riki Michele – background vocals ("Look Out (For Your Own)")
 Jerry Chamberlain – background vocals ("So Far Away")
 Sharon McCall – background vocals ("So Far Away")
 Marc Sercomb – spoken verses ("The Rifleman")

Production
 Tom Willett – executive producer
 Derri Daugherty – producer, engineer, recording
 Steve Hindalong - producer, engineer, recording, handwritten liner notes
 Steve Griffith - additional production
 Gene Eugene - additional production, recording
 Dave Hackbarth – engineer, recording
 Mark Heard – engineer, recording
 John Joseph Flynn – concept and design, for OZ graphics
 Tim Alderson – art direction and coordination 
 Stewart Ivester – photography
 Phillip Foster – additional graphic assistance
 Stewart Ivester – additional graphic assistance
 Ed at Slides and Print – additional graphic assistance
 June at Slides and Print – additional graphic assistance
 Marcella at Slides and Print – additional graphic assistance
 Brian Martin - manager

References
Footnotes

Bibliography

External links
 

1988 albums
The Choir (alternative rock band) albums